Montpellier HSC VB or simply Montpellier Volley, is a professional men's volleyball club located in the city of Montpellier in southern France. Montpellier competes in the top flight of French volleyball, Ligue A. 

The club has won 8 league titles and 1 SuperCup which makes them one of the most successful clubs in French volleyball.

Honours

Domestic
 French Championship
Winners (8): 1946–47, 1948–49, 1949–50, 1950–51, 1971–72, 1972–73, 1974–75, 2021–22 

 French SuperCup
Winners (1): 2022–23

International
 CEV Cup
Semifinalists (1): 2020–21

Team
As of 2022–23 season

References

External links
 Official website 
 Team profile at Volleybox.net

French volleyball clubs
Sport in Montpellier
Volleyball clubs established in 1941
1941 establishments in France